The 1993–94 Liga Artzit season saw Ironi Rishon LeZion, Hapoel Beit She'an (for the first time in their history) and Beitar Tel Aviv promoted to Liga Leumit. Shimshon Tel Aviv, who finished fourth, missed out on promotion after losing a play-off with top flight club Hapoel Haifa.

At the other end of the table, Maccabi Acre and Hapoel Daliyat al-Karmel were automatically relegated to Liga Alef.

Final table

Promotion-relegation play-offs
4th-placed Shimshon Tel Aviv played-off against Hapoel Haifa, who had finished 13th in Liga Leumit. Although Shimshon won the first leg (played in Haifa) 1–0, Hapoel won the return 3–0 to remain in the top division.

References
Israel 1993/94 RSSSF

Liga Artzit seasons
Israel
2